Jerome C. Davis (1822—1881) was an American agriculturalist for whom the city of Davis, California (formerly Davisville) is named. Davis was born in Perry County, Ohio, where his father Isaac Davis and his mother Rachael Manley had a family farm. He also had a brother, Franklin B., and a sister, Elnora.

Davis was one of the early pioneers to arrive in what is now California. In 1845, at the age of 23, Davis joined Captain John C. Fremont on his third expedition to the West and was with Fremont for 32 months. In June 1846, Davis was one of thirty-three members of the Bear Flag Party, which traveled to Sonoma and captured the Mexican Fort under the command of Mexican General Mariano Guadalupe Vallejo. It was then that Davis and his thirty-two colleagues, popularly known in history as the “Bear Flag Party” raised the Bear Flag, and proclaimed California's independence from Mexico.

Jerome got his start in California as a ferry operator on the Sacramento River with his father-in-law, and later become a prominent landowner with 12,000 acres of farmland. 773 acres of his farm was purchased to be part of the newly formed University of California, Davis. Davis served as the president of the State Agricultural Society (predecessor to California Exposition), and opened the 8th annual California State Fair in 1861.

References

External links
 Biography on DavisWiki

1822 births
1881 deaths
People from Perry County, Ohio
People from Davis, California